Argentona is a municipality in the comarca of the Maresme in Catalonia, Spain. It is situated on the south-east side of the granite Litoral range, to the north-west of Mataró. The town is both a tourist centre and a notable horticultural centre. A local road links the municipality with Cabrera de Mar and with the main N-II road at Vilassar de Mar.

The town centre has buildings in a wide range of styles. The late gothic church of Sant Julià was restored by Josep Puig i Cadafalch. The same architect designed Casa Gari, a private residence adjoining the chapel of Sant Miquel del Cros, a work in the style of Antoni Gaudí by Lluís Bonet (1929). There are several buildings from the 16th to the 17th centuries, as well as the Roman chapel of La Mare de Déu del Viver and the benedictine priory of Sant Pere de Clarà. There is an interesting museum dedicated to water jugs, the Argentona Water Jug Museum, in which there are exhibited more than 700 pieces, including four ceramic works by Pablo Picasso.
The town festival (Festa Major) occurs every 4 August, to celebrate St Dominic.

The mayor of this town is Eudald Calvo Català.

Demography

References
Citations

Sources
 Panareda Clopés, Josep Maria; Rios Calvet, Jaume; Rabella Vives, Josep Maria (1989). Guia de Catalunya, Barcelona: Caixa de Catalunya.  (Spanish).  (Catalan).

External links

Official website 
 Government data pages 
Patrimoni monumental d'Argentona 

Municipalities in Maresme
Populated places in Maresme